The Dybbuk. A Tale of Wandering Souls is a 2015 documentary film by Polish filmmaker and director Krzysztof Kopczyński. The film tells the story of a conflict between Orthodox Jews and Ukrainian far-right activists in Uman, a city in Ukraine, just before the 2013 Euromaidan protests.

Every year, 30,000 Hasidim journey to Uman to celebrate the Jewish New Year at the gravesite of their holy leader Rebbe Nachman. Meanwhile, a Ukrainian far-right group erects a cross at the site of Hasidic prayers and builds a monument to Cossacks who slaughtered thousands of Jews and Poles in 1768 during a national rebellion.

The film opened the 55th Krakow Film Festival, where it received the Silver Hobby-Horse for the Director of the Best Documentary Film. The prize was awarded "for courage and non-conformity in showing an extremely complicated and universal problem of reciprocal intolerance when facing the dangers of the contemporary world." On 6th Odessa International Film Festival the film received FIPRESCI prize for a feature-length film.

References

External links
 

2015 films
2015 documentary films
Polish documentary films
Documentary films about Ukraine
Documentary films about Jews and Judaism
Hasidic Judaism in Ukraine
Orthodox Judaism in Ukraine
Uman
Ukrainian nationalism